Oreopanax echinops is a species of plant in the family Araliaceae. It is found in Guatemala, Honduras, and Mexico. It is threatened by habitat loss.

References

echinops
Vulnerable plants
Taxonomy articles created by Polbot
Cloud forest flora of Mexico